Three Encounters is a 1948 Soviet drama film directed by Aleksandr Ptushko, Vsevolod Pudovkin and Sergei Yutkevich.

Plot 

The film consists of several novellas about people returning from the front: engineer-blast-furnace Kornev, who became a major, Sergeant-Major Samoseev, who became chairman of the collective farm, Senior Lieutenant Rudnikov, going to the Arctic expedition and Lieutenant Bella Mukhtarova, traveling with a group of geologists to the East.

Starring 
 Tamara Makarova as Olimpiada Samoseeva
 Boris Chirkov as Nikanor Samoseev
 Nikolay Kryuchkov as Maksim Kornev
 Yuliya Borisova as Oksana
 Klara Luchko as Bella
 Mikhail Derzhavin	
 Leonid Kmit	
 Andrey Tutyshkin		
 Georgiy Yumatov

References

External links 
 

1948 films
1940s Russian-language films
Soviet drama films
1948 drama films
Soviet black-and-white films